Kilbrannan Sound (Scottish Gaelic: An Caolas Branndanach) is a marine water body that separates the Kintyre Peninsula of Scotland from the island of Arran. Kilbrannan Sound is the western arm of the Firth of Clyde.

See also
 Dippen Bay
 Kildonald Bay

References

Sounds of Argyll and Bute
Landforms of the Isle of Arran
Firth of Clyde